Lowber, Pennsylvania may refer to the following places in the U.S. state of Pennsylvania:

Lowber, Fayette County, Pennsylvania
Lowber, Westmoreland County, Pennsylvania